Snowshoe Bandits is a 1928 German-Norwegian silent comedy film directed by Uwe Jens Krafft and starring Aud Egede-Nissen and Paul Richter.

The film's art direction was by Jacek Rotmil.

Cast

References

Bibliography

External links

1928 films
Films of the Weimar Republic
Films directed by Uwe Jens Krafft
German silent feature films
Norwegian silent feature films
German black-and-white films
1928 comedy films
Norwegian comedy films
German comedy films
Silent comedy films
1920s German films